The 1990–91 UEFA Cup was won by Internazionale on aggregate over Roma. This tournament also marked the return of English clubs after a five-year ban resulting from the Heysel Stadium disaster in 1985. However, for this season, only one English club (English First Division runners-up Aston Villa) competed in the UEFA Cup, from a previous total of four.

Teams
A total of 64 teams participated in the competition, all entering into the first round. Spain, Romania and Denmark gained a slot, while the Soviet Union, Scotland, Austria, France and Yugoslavia lost a slot (the latter two due to the end of the English ban).

Notes

First round

|}

First leg

Second leg

Borussia Dortmund won 4–0 on aggregate.

3–3 on aggregate; Real Sociedad won on away goals.

Admira Wacker won 4–0 on aggregate.

Luzern won 3–2 on aggregate.

Vitesse won 1–0 on aggregate.

Bordeaux won 2–0 on aggregate.

1. FC Magdeburg won 1–0 on aggregate.

Roma won 2–0 on aggregate.

Aston Villa won 5–2 on aggregate.

1–1 on aggregate; Atalanta won on away goals.

Bayer Leverkusen won 2–1 on aggregate.

Brøndby won 6–4 on aggregate.

Inter Bratislava won 6–2 on aggregate.

Chornomorets Odesa won 4–3 on aggregate.

Hearts won 4–2 on aggregate.

Torpedo Moscow won 5–2 on aggregate.

Politehnica Timișoara won 2–1 on aggregate.

Fenerbahçe won 6–2 on aggregate.

Dundee United won 5–3 on aggregate.

GKS Katowice won 4–0 on aggregate.

Partizan won 5–0 on aggregate.

Köln won 3–1 on aggregate.

Valencia won 2–0 on aggregate.

Universitatea Craiova won 2–0 on aggregate.

Omonia won 5–4 on aggregate.

Ferencváros won 3–1 on aggregate.

Anderlecht won 4–0 on aggregate.

Monaco won 6–2 on aggregate.

0–0 on aggregate; Sevilla won 4–3 on penalties.

Internazionale won 4–3 on aggregate.

Sporting CP won 3–2 on aggregate.

Bologna won 2–0 on aggregate.

Second round

|}

First leg

Second leg

Köln won 2–1 on aggregate.

Borussia Dortmund won 4–0 on aggregate.

Bordeaux won 2–0 on aggregate.

Anderlecht won 4–1 on aggregate.

Internazionale won 3–2 on aggregate.

Brøndby won 4–0 on aggregate.

Monaco won 1–0 on aggregate.

Admira Wacker won 2–1 on aggregate.

Torpedo Moscow won 4–3 on aggregate.

Atalanta won 5–1 on aggregate.

Bayer Leverkusen won 6–1 on aggregate.

Bologna won 4–3 on aggregate.

Sporting CP won 7–2 on aggregate.

Roma won 3–2 on aggregate.

Vitesse won 5–0 on aggregate.

1–1 on aggregate; Partizan won 4–3 on penalties.

Third round

|}

First leg

Second leg

Brøndby won 3–0 on aggregate.

Torpedo Moscow won 4–2 on aggregate.

Atalanta won 2–1 on aggregate.

Roma won 7–0 on aggregate.

Internazionale won 4–1 on aggregate.

2–2 on aggregate; Anderlecht won on away goals.

3–3 aggregate; Bologna won 6–5 on penalties.

Sporting CP won 4–1 on aggregate.

Quarter-finals

|}

First leg

Second leg

Roma won 6–2 on aggregate.

Internazionale won 2–0 on aggregate.

Sporting CP won 3–1 on aggregate.

1–1 on aggregate; Brøndby won 4–2 on penalties.

Semi-finals

|}

First leg

Second leg

Roma won 2–1 on aggregate.

Internazionale won 2–0 on aggregate.

Final

First leg

Second leg

Internazionale won 2–1 on aggregate.

External links
1990–91 All matches UEFA Cup – season at UEFA website
Official site
Results at RSSSF.com
 All scorers 1990–91 UEFA Cup according to protocols UEFA
1990/91 UEFA Cup - results and line-ups (archive)

 
UEFA Cup seasons
2